Sic58 Squadra Corse is an Italian motorcycle racing team founded by Paolo Simoncelli in honour of his son, Marco Simoncelli (1987–2011). The team competes in the Moto3 World Championship and MotoE World Cup under the name Ongetta Sic58 Squadracorse, and the FIM CEV Repsol Moto3 Junior World Championship and European Talent Cup.

History

The team was formed by Paolo Simoncelli in 2013 after the death of his son, MotoGP rider Marco Simoncelli, at the 2011 Malaysian Grand Prix. The team name Sic58 Squadra Corse (English: Sic58 Racing Team) is a reference to Marco's nickname "Super Sic" or simply "Sic" and his former racing number 58, which was retired from use in the MotoGP class following his death. The formation of the team was also supported by compatriot Fausto Gresini, who had been Simoncelli's team boss at the time of his death. The intention of the Sic58 team is to promote the careers of young Italian motorcycle racers.

The team originally entered the FIM CIV Moto3 Junior Championship in Italy. Simoncelli quickly realized that in order for his riders to get to the World Championship level, they would need to prove themselves in the more competitive and better-organized Spanish FIM CEV Repsol Moto3 Junior World Championship, so the team began competing in that series in 2015. Sic58 achieved their first taste of international success with a win from Italian rider Tony Arbolino at the second race in the 2016 CEV round in Jerez. The team also enters riders in the European Talent Cup, a support series of FIM CEV Repsol.

In 2017, Sic58 entered the Moto3 World Championship with existing team rider Tony Arbolino partnered with new signing Tatsuki Suzuki, a Japanese rider with previous Moto3 World Championship experience. The team had a difficult start. Arbolino achieved only a single points finish, finishing 34th in the riders' standings. Suzuki achieved points finishes in all races he completed, including a best finish of 4th, but 7 retirements limited him to 71 points and 14th position in the riders' standings. For 2018, Arbolino was replaced by compatriot Niccolò Antonelli coming from the Red Bull KTM Ajo team. The season was only a slight improvement over 2017, with both Suzuki and Antonelli repeating the former's 71 points and finishing 14th and 15th in the riders' standings respectively. The team finished 7th of 16 teams, with 2018 being the first year a Moto3 teams' championship was counted.

In 2019, Sic58 achieved their first success on the world stage with a 1-2 finish from Antonelli and Suzuki. The win occurred in the fourth round of the championship at Jerez, coincidentally the same location of Marco Simoncelli's maiden World Championship victory in the former 125 cc class, leading to an emotional celebration from the team. Suzuki repeated success for the team with a win in San Marino. The remainder of the season was however plagued by multiple injuries for Antonelli, and 8 retirements for Suzuki, limiting both riders to 7th and 8th in the riders' standings respectively, and the team to 2nd in the team standings. The team was additionally granted a slot in the inaugural 2019 season of the MotoE World Cup, achieving one 3rd place podium finish at the San Marino round.

Results 

Notes
* Season still in progress.

References

External links
 

Motorcycle racing teams
Motorcycle racing teams established in 2013
2013 establishments in Italy